Frau Jenny Treibel is a German novel published in 1892 by Theodor Fontane.

Plot 
The primary subject of the novel revolves around two Berlin families. One is the upper-class Treibel family consisting of the Councillor of commerce and his wife, Frau Jenny, as well as their sons Otto and Leopold. The other family is that of Professor Wilibald Schmidt and his daughter Corinna. The families have a connection that has existed for decades. Years before, when Wilibald was still a student, he was also the secret admirer of Jenny, who at that time was the daughter of Willibald's landlord. The landlord was the proprietor of a small basement shop. Willibald even went so far as to write a poem to Jenny in which he pronounced his love for her, though he failed to achieve the desired effect. The poem itself was of a modest literary achievement, but due to the young student's overwhelming sentimentality at the time, Jenny continues to bring the poem up in conversation often.

Wilibald would like to see his daughter Corinna marry her cousin Marcell, a promising future archaeologist. Unfortunately, Marcell can not bring himself to propose to her. In any case, the intelligent and independent Corinna has other plans for herself. She wants to break out of the rather mediocre world of a secondary school teacher's household. She finds the social life with the wives of the other teachers quite boring, and her father's correction of pupils’ school work offers little variation. Thus Corinna sets herself to marrying Leopold Treibel. Social position and material prosperity would seem to her an adequate guarantee for a happy future. Thus she uses any means possible in order to lure the kind but easily influenced Leopold into her trap. She uses all the charm and wit she can manage. Two dinner parties and an outing later she achieves her goal. They enter into a secret engagement. When Jenny finds out about the engagement, she is furious and makes it clear to Corinna that she does not want it to go ahead. Leopold, who is a shy and timid young man, promises Corinna that he will stand up to his mother and that the two shall be wed. Unfortunately he is not able to keep his word and when Corinna realizes this, she breaks off the engagement. The novel ends with Corinna and Marcell's wedding. The reader is led to believe that Leopold marries Hildegard Munk (whom Jenny didn't really want as a daughter in law but had to make do with, so that Leopold wouldn't move down in class, i.e. by marrying Corinna).

External links
 Frau Jenny Treibel: full German text

1892 German novels
Novels by Theodor Fontane
Novels set in Berlin
German novels adapted into films